Zoé is a Grammy Award and Latin Grammy Award-winning Mexican rock band. It was initially formed in Mexico City in 1994, although membership started to stabilize in 1997. The band has achieved success in Mexico and most Spanish-speaking countries with albums such as Rocanlover, Memo Rex Commander y el Corazón Atómico de la Vía Láctea and Reptilectric.

History
Zoé's history begins in Mexico in 1994, with slight influences from Seattle's grunge, Zoé went through a period of changing line-ups and varying styles before stabilizing in 1997, with León Larregui (guitar and voice), Sergio Acosta (guitar), Alberto Cabrera (drums), Ángel Mosqueda (bass guitar) and Jesus Báez (keyboards). By this time, a clear influence from The Beatles could be seen alongside the Britpop and grunge stylings.

1998–2004: Debut album and Rocanlover
Faced with a lack of venues in which to showcase their music, Zoé relied upon self-organized concerts, the Internet and a self-published demo. All of these efforts, plus a good deal of positive word of mouth, helped them gain popularity in Spanish-language radio stations in the United States. They signed their first recording contract in 1998, but nothing came of it. They independently released an album in 2000 that attracted the attention of Sony Music, who took over its distribution. Popular songs from this recording included "Asteroide" and "Miel". Following the success of this album, some of their songs were included in the soundtracks of movies like Amar Te Duele, Ladies Night and The Dreamer.

In November 2003, Zoé released a second album, produced by Phil Vinall, who had previously worked with bands like Placebo and Elastica. This new album was titled Rocanlover, and the main singles were "Peace and Love", "Love" and "Veneno". Although their musical style was becoming more clearly defined, the band had still not found an identity. In 2017, looking back at this period, Larreguí characterized this as a time of experimentation and trying different things; for example the band had not decided if they wanted to record more songs in English.

2004–2007: The Room, Rocanlover and Memo Rex Commander
Zoé left Sony in early 2004. The band kept working and touring during the whole year without a label behind them and started to gain a big following with the self-promoted singles "Love" and "Veneno". In early 2005, the band started working on new songs for their next album. By mid-2005, the band had recorded the song "Dead" with their own resources. Also at this time, Cabrera left the band and Rodrigo Guardiola joined. Some major labels in Mexico were very interested in signing the band, but Zoé, tired of their bad past experiences, surprised everyone and signed an independent deal with Noiselab, a fast-growing independent label from Mexico. New songs to complete the EP, named The Room, were written. The EP became an instant hit, going Gold after selling more than 50,000 units. Some new songs were recorded in English, and some producers, like Alan McGee, expressed interest in taking them to the UK and Europe. The release of the EP was followed by two sold-out shows at the Metropolitan Theater in Mexico City and a national tour.

The first six months of 2006 were quite active for Zoé. They kept playing strategic shows like the Vive Latino Festival and devoted themselves to the production of their third studio album. In January, the band went to Manzanillo to start preproduction with the British producer Phil Vinall. In February, there were shows and more preproduction in Mexico City, and March was used for basic tracking at Sonic Ranch Studios in Tornillo, Texas. In April, post-production and more shows; the songs were mixed in May. The album was finished by early June.

Memo Rex Commander y el Corazón Atómico de la Vía Láctea (Memo Rex Commander and the Atomic Heart of the Milky Way) was released on 12 July 2006, going straight in to the Mexican charts at number one. The first single from the album, "Vía Láctea", had some rotation in local music channels like MTV Latin America and Telehit. The album achieved gold record status after more than 40,000 units sold in the four weeks after its release and it received very good reviews from the specialized press.

On 1 September 2006, Zoé performed in Mexico's National Auditorium, a sold-out show in one of the most important stages for music in Mexico. Later, at the Palacio de los Deportes, they performed with Nick McCarthy, the guitarist (and sometimes vocalist) from the Scottish band Franz Ferdinand. In November 2006, they toured with Gustavo Cerati and Los Tres in Mexico and the United States. On 28 November 2007, they recorded their first live CD/DVD, in the Palacio de los Deportes ("Sports Palace"). The CD version is available with the title of 281107.

2008–2010: Reptilectric
In fall 2008, Zoé released a fourth album, Reptilectric. Containing 11 tracks, all in Spanish, Reptilectric signalled the end of Zoé's experimentation with writing and recording songs in English. It was produced by Phill Vinall. The title track was released as the first single on 8 September. The album debuted at number one in the Mexican charts and it was subsequently certified platinum for over 80,000 copies sold there. The band toured in support of the album in Mexico, Latin America, the United States and Spain. A remix album called Reptilectric Revisitado was released in October 2009, with remixed versions of the songs on the original album as well as cover versions by other Latin American artists. In Spain, the band released 01-10, a compilation album of some of the band's biggest hits and new versions of songs from Reptilectric and Memo Rex Commander featuring the Spanish artists Enrique Bunbury, Anni B. Sweet, Dorian and Vetusta Morla. The band performed at Coachella in support of Reptilectric.

2011–2012: Música de Fondo
In March 2011, the band released an MTV Unplugged album titled Música de Fondo (Ambient Music), with new interpretations of their biggest hits as well as new music. Guest performers included Adrian Dargelos, Enrique Bunbury, Chetes and Denise Gutiérrez of Hello Seahorse!. Four singles were released from the album: "Soñé", "Labios Rotos", "Luna" and a cover version of "Bésame Mucho". With this album, the band was nominated for awards at the Latin Grammy, Lunas Del Auditorio and MTV Europe Music Awards. In October 2011, the album went Gold in Colombia,  the band's first album to do so outside of Mexico. As a personal thank you for the overwhelming success of this album, the band released a special single called "Energía" ("Energy") in February 2012.

2013–present: Prográmaton and Aztlán
Zoé released a fifth album, Prográmaton, and announced an extended tour of 75 shows in 16 countries. In this new stage, Zoé presented what could be labeled their most mature and experimental work. The personnel that achieve this combination of music, lyrics and instrumental talents are Leon Larregui (vocals, guitar), Sergio Acosta (guitar), Jesús Báez (keyboards), Angel Mosqueda (bass guitar) and Rodrigo Guardiola (drums).

After a two-year break where they launched a documentary called Panoramas and where Larregui released his second solo album, Zoé released the single "Azul" on 1 March 2018. Weeks after, the singles "Temor y Temblor" and "Clarividad" where also released, announcing their inclusion in the album Aztlán (album), which was released on 20 April 2018.

Tour
Zoé Unplugged Tour

Discography

Studio albums
Zoé (2001)
Rocanlover (2003)
Memo Rex Commander y el Corazón Atómico de la Vía Láctea (2006)
Reptilectric (2008)
Prográmaton (2013)
Aztlán (2018)
Sonidos de Karmática Resonancia (2021)

EP
The Room (EP) (2005)

Compilations
Grandes Hits (2005)
Noiselab 001 (2002)
Zoé Hits 01–06 (2006)
Reptilectric Revisitado (2009)
01-10 (2010)

Live albums
281107 (2008)
MTV Unplugged/Música de Fondo (2011)
8.11.14 (2015)

Singles
"Deja te Conecto" (2001) ("Let Me Connect You")
"Asteroide" (2002) ("Asteroid")
"Miel" (2002) ("Honey")
"Peace and Love" (2003)
"Love" (2004)
"Veneno" (2004) ("Poison")
"Dead" (2005)
"Vía Láctea" (2006) ("Milky Way")
"No me Destruyas" (2006) ("Don't Destroy Me")
"Paula" (2007)
"Reptilectric" (2008)
"Nada" (2009) ("Nothing")
"Poli" (2009)
"Labios Rotos" (2010) ("Torn Lips")
"Luna" (2011) ("Moon")
"Bésame Mucho" (2011) ("Kiss me a lot")
"Energía" (2012) ("Energy")
"10 A.M." (2013) ("10 A.M.")
"Azul" (2018) ("Blue")
"El Duelo" (2020) ("The Duel")

Awards and nominations

Grammy Awards

Latin Grammy Awards

References

External links

Zoé, Ground Control, September 2007
Zoé at Rock en Español

Capitol Latin artists
Latin Grammy Award winners
Mexican alternative rock groups
Rock en Español music groups
Universal Music Latin Entertainment artists